Urban of Macedonia is numbered among the Seventy Apostles. St. Andrew ordained Urban bishop in Macedonia. He died a martyr, and his feast day is October 31.

Urban is venerated as saint by Eastern Orthodox Church (January 4, October 31), Roman Catholic Church (July 13) and other Christian Churches.

Hymns
Troparion (Tone 3)
Holy Apostles of the Seventy: Stáchys, Amplías, Úrban, Narcíssus, Apélles, and Aristobúlus,
Eentreat the merciful God
To grant our souls forgiveness of transgressions.
Kontakion (Tone 8)
Let us thankfully praise the wise Apostles
Stáchys, Amplías, Úrban, Narcíssus, Apélles, and Aristobúlus,
Those treasures of the Holy Spirit and rays of the Sun of glory,
Who were gathered together by the grace of our God.

Sources 
St. Nikolai Velimirovic, The Prologue from Ohrid

External links
Apostle Urban of the Seventy (OCA)

References

Seventy disciples
1st-century Christian saints
1st-century deaths
Saints of Roman Macedonia
Year of birth unknown